Southend-on-Sea, commonly referred to as Southend, is a coastal city and unitary authority area with borough status in southeastern Essex, England. It is bordered to the north by Rochford and to the west by Castle Point. It is home to the longest pleasure pier in the world, Southend Pier. London Southend Airport is located north of the city centre.

Southend-on-Sea originally consisted of a few poor fishermen's huts and farms at the southern end of the village of Prittlewell. In the 1790s, the first buildings around what was to become the High Street of Southend were completed. In the 19th century, Southend's status of a seaside resort grew after a visit from Princess Caroline of Brunswick, and Southend Pier was constructed. From the 1960s onwards, the city declined as a holiday destination. Southend redeveloped itself as the home of the Access credit card, due to its having one of the UK's first electronic telephone exchanges. After the 1960s, much of the city centre was developed for commerce and retail, and many original structures were lost to redevelopment. An annual seafront airshow, which started in 1986 and featured a flypast by Concorde, used to take place each May until 2012.

On 18 October 2021, it was announced that Southend would be granted city status, as a memorial to the Member of Parliament for Southend West, Sir David Amess, a long-time supporter of city status for the borough, who was fatally stabbed on 15 October 2021. Southend was granted city status by letters patent dated 26 January 2022. On 1 March 2022, the letters patent were presented to Southend Borough Council by Charles, Prince of Wales.

History
Originally the "south end" of the village of Prittlewell, Southend was home to a few poor fishermens' huts and farms at the southern extremity of Prittlewell Priory land. In the 1790s, landowner Daniel Scratton sold off land on either side of what was to become the High Street. The Grand Hotel (now Royal Hotel) and Grove Terrace (now Royal Terrace) were completed by 1794, and stagecoaches from London made it accessible. Due to the bad transportation links between Southend and London, there was not rapid development during the Georgian Era as there was in Brighton. But after the coming of the railways in the 19th century and the visit of Princess Caroline of Brunswick, Southend's status as a seaside resort grew. During the 19th century Southend's pier was first constructed and the Clifftown development built, attracting many summer tourists to its seven miles of beaches and sea bathing. Good rail connections and proximity to London mean that much of the economy has been based on tourism, and that Southend has been a dormitory town for city workers ever since. It has suffered fires and ship collisions, most recently in October 2005, but the basic pier structure has been repaired each time.

As a holiday destination, Southend declined from the 1960s onwards, as holidaying abroad became more affordable. Southend became the home of the Access credit card, as it had one of the UK's first electronic telephone exchanges (it is still home to RBS Card Services – one of the former members of Access), with offices based in the former EKCO factory, Maitland House (Keddies), Victoria Circus and Southchurch Road. Since then, much of the city centre has been developed for commerce and retail, and during the 1960s many original structures were lost to redevelopment – such as the Talza Arcade and Victoria Market (replaced by what is now known as The Victoria Shopping Centre) and Southend Technical College (on the site of the ODEON Cinema, now a campus of South Essex College). However, about 6.4 million tourists still visit Southend per year, generating estimated revenues of £200 million a year. H.M. Revenue & Customs (HMRC), (formerly H.M. Customs and Excise), are major employers in the city, and the central offices for the collection of VAT are located at Alexander House on Victoria Avenue.

An annual seafront airshow, started in 1986 when it featured a flypast by Concorde whilst on a passenger charter flight, used to take place each May and became one of Europe's largest free airshows. The aircraft flew parallel to the seafront, offset over the sea. The RAF Falcons parachute display team and RAF Red Arrows aerobatics team were regular visitors to the show. The last show was held in 2012; an attempt to revive the show for September 2015, as the Southend Airshow and Military Festival, failed.

On 15 October 2021, the Member of Parliament for Southend West, Sir David Amess, was fatally stabbed during a constituency meeting in Leigh-on-Sea. On 18 October 2021, the Prime Minister, Boris Johnson, announced that the Queen had agreed to grant Southend-on-Sea with city status as a memorial to Amess, who had long campaigned for this status to be granted. Preparations, led by Amess, for Southend to enter a competition for city status in 2022 as part of the Queen's Platinum Jubilee were underway at the time of his death. A "City Week" was held throughout the town between 13 and 20 February 2022, beginning with the inaugural "He Built This City" concert named in honour of Amess. The concert was held at the Cliffs Pavilion and included performers such as Digby Fairweather, Lee Mead, and Leanne Jarvis. Other events such as a city ceremony and the Southend LuminoCity Festival of Light were held during the week. Sam Duckworth, who knew Amess personally, performed at some of the events. On 1 March, Southend Borough Council was presented letters patent from the Queen, by Charles, Prince of Wales, officially granting the borough city status. Southend became the second city in the ceremonial county of Essex, after Chelmsford, which was granted city status in 2012.

Governance

Local government district
Southend-on-Sea was formed as a municipal borough in 1892 with the functions of local government shared with Essex County Council. In 1913, the borough was enlarged by the former area of Leigh on Sea Urban District. In 1914 the enlarged Southend gained the status of county borough, exempt from county council control and a single-tier of local government. The county borough was enlarged in 1933 by the former area of Shoeburyness Urban District and part of Rochford Rural District.

On 1 April 1974, under the Local Government Act 1972, Southend became a district of Essex with borough status and its civil parish was abolished. However, in 1998 it again became the single tier of local government when it became a unitary authority.

Upon receiving city status on 1 March 2022, the council voted to rename itself 'Southend-on-Sea City Council'.

Council

Seventeen wards each return three councillors, a total of 51. Councillors serve four years and one third of the council is elected each year, followed by one year without election. Following the 2019 election results, the composition of the council is:

The council was controlled by the Conservative Party after they gained control in the 2000 election. They maintained a minority administration after the 2012 local elections, however the council was run by a coalition of Lib Dems, Labour and Independents after June 2014, with the Conservatives gaining overall control again in 2018. In 2019, the coalition regained control. Most day-to-day decisions are by an eight-member executive headed by the council leader.

The Latin motto, 'Per Mare Per Ecclesiam', emblazoned on the municipal coat of arms, translates as 'By [the] Sea, By [the] Church', reflecting Southend's position between the church at Prittlewell and the sea as in the Thames estuary. The city has been twinned with the resort of Sopot in Poland since 1999 and has been developing three-way associations with Lake Worth Beach, Florida.

Southend Borough Council was criticised as one of the worst financially managed local authorities in England by the Audit Commission report for 2006–07 one of three to gain only one of four stars, the others being Liverpool and the Isles of Scilly. Areas of criticism were the use of consultants and the spending of £3.5 million on taxis during the 2006–07 financial year.

However, in March 2012, Southend Borough Council was awarded the title of 'Council of the Year 2012' by the Local Government Chronicle.

During the 2015 general and local election there was a turnout of 62.17%, equating to 80,899 votes cast.

Southend Civic Centre was designed by borough architect, Patrick Burridge, and officially opened by the Queen Mother on 31 October 1967.

Members of Parliament

Southend is represented by two Members of Parliament (MPs) at Westminster.

The MP for Southend West was Sir David Amess (Conservative), who served from 1997 until his murder in 2021. Anna Firth has served as the MP for the constituency since the following 2022 Southend West by-election.

Since 2005 the MP for Rochford and Southend East has been James Duddridge (Conservative), who replaced Sir Teddy Taylor. Despite its name the majority of the constituency is in Southend, including the centre of the city; Rochford makes up only a small part and the majority of Rochford District Council is represented in the Rayleigh constituency.

Demography

Southend is the seventh most densely populated area in the United Kingdom outside of the London Boroughs, with 38.8 people per hectare compared to a national average of 3.77. By 2006, the majority, or 52% of the Southend population were between the ages of 16–54, 18% were below age 15, 18% were above age 65 and the middle age populace between 55 and 64 accounted for the remaining 12%.

Save the Children's research data shows that for 2008–09, Southend had 4,000 children living in poverty, a rate of 12%, the same as Thurrock, but above the 11% child poverty rate of Essex as a whole.

The Department for Communities and Local Government's 2010 Indices of Multiple Deprivation Deprivation Indices data showed that Southend is one of Essex's most deprived areas. Out of 32,482 Lower Super Output Areas in England, area 014D in the Kursaal ward is 99th, area 015B in Milton ward is 108th, area 010A in Victoria ward is 542nd, and area 009D in Southchurch ward is 995th, as well as an additional 5 areas all within the top 10% most deprived areas in England (with the most deprived area having a rank of 1 and the least deprived a rank of 32,482). Victoria and Milton wards have the highest proportion of ethnic minority residents – at the 2011 Census these figures were 24.2% and 26.5% respectively. Southend has the highest percentage of residents receiving housing benefit (19%) and the third highest percentage of residents receiving council tax benefit in Essex.

The urban area of Southend spills outside of the borough boundaries into the neighbouring Castle Point and Rochford districts, including the towns of Hadleigh, Benfleet, Rayleigh and Rochford, as well as the villages of Hockley and Hullbridge. According to the 2011 census, it had a population of 295,310, making it the largest urban area solely within the East of England.

Economy
This is a chart of trend of regional gross value added of Southend-on-Sea at current basic prices published (pp. 240–253) by Office for National Statistics with figures in millions of British Pounds Sterling.

In 2006, travel insurance company InsureandGo relocated its offices from Braintree to Maitland House in Southend-on-Sea. The company brought 120 existing jobs from Braintree and announced the intention to create more in the future. However the business announced the plan to relocate to Bristol in 2016. The building is now home to Ventrica, a customer service outsourcing company.

Southend has industrial parks located at Progress Road, Comet and Aviation Ways in Eastwood and Stock Road in Sutton. Firms located in Southend include Olympus Keymed, Hi-Tec Sports and MK Electric. Southend has declined as a centre for credit card management with only Royal Bank of Scotland card services (now branded NatWest) still operating in the city.

A fifth of the working population commutes to London daily. Wages for jobs based in Southend were the second lowest among UK cities in 2015. It also has the fourth highest proportion of people aged over 65. This creates considerable pressures on the housing market. It is the 11th most expensive place to live in Britain.

Southend-on-Sea County Borough Corporation had provided the borough with electricity since the early twentieth century from Southend power station. Upon nationalisation of the electricity industry in 1948 ownership passed to the British Electricity Authority and later to the Central Electricity Generating Board. Electricity connections to the national grid rendered the 5.75 megawatt (MW) power station redundant. Electricity was generated by diesel engines and by steam obtained from the exhaust gases. The power station closed in 1966; in its final year of operation it delivered 2,720 MWh of electricity to the borough.

Transport

Airport

London Southend Airport was developed from the military airfield at Rochford; it was opened as a civil airport in 1935. It now offers scheduled flights to destinations across Europe, corporate and recreational flights, aircraft maintenance and training for pilots and engineers. It is served by Southend Airport railway station, on the Shenfield–Southend line.

Buses

Local bus services are provided by two main companies. Arriva Southend was formerly the council-owned Southend Corporation Transport and First Essex Buses was formerly Eastern National/Thamesway. Smaller providers include Stephensons of Essex.

Southend has a bus station in Chichester Road, which was developed from a temporary facility added in the 1970s; the previous bus station was located on London Road and was run by Eastern National, but it was demolished in the 1980s to make way for a Sainsbury's supermarket. Arriva Southend is the only bus company based in Southend, with their depot located in Short Street; it was previously sited on the corner of London Road and Queensway and also a small facility in Tickfield Road. First Essex's buses in the Southend area are based out of the depot in Hadleigh but, prior to the 1980s, Eastern National had depots on London Road (at the bus station) and Fairfax Drive.

Railway

Southend is served by two lines on the National Rail network:

 Running from Southend Victoria north out of the city is the Shenfield–Southend line, a branch of the Great Eastern Main Line, operated by Abellio Greater Anglia. Services operate to London Liverpool Street, via .
Additionally, one service from Southend Central each weekday evening terminates at Liverpool Street.

From 1910 to 1939, the London Underground's District line's eastbound service ran as far as Southend and Shoeburyness.

Besides its main line railway connections, Southend is also the home of two smaller railways. The Southend Pier Railway provides transport along the length of Southend Pier, whilst the nearby Southend Cliff Railway provides a connection from the promenade to the cliff top above.

Roads

Two A-roads connect Southend with London and the rest of the country: the A127 (Southend Arterial Road), via Basildon and Romford, and the A13, via Tilbury and London Docklands. Both are major routes; however, within the borough, the A13 is now a single carriageway local route, whereas the A127 is entirely dual carriageway. Both connect to the M25 and eventually London.

Climate

Southend-on-Sea is one of the driest places in the UK. Summer temperatures are generally slightly cooler than those in London. Frosts are occasional. During the 1991–2020 period there was an average of 29.6 days of air frost. Rainfall averaged . Weather station data is available from Shoeburyness, which is adjacent to Southend in the eastern part of the urban area.

Education

Secondary schools
All mainstream secondary schools are mixed-sex comprehensives, including Belfairs Academy; Cecil Jones Academy; Chase High School; Southchurch High School; Shoeburyness High School and The Eastwood Academy.

In 2004, Southend retained the grammar school system and has four such schools: Southend High School for Boys; Southend High School for Girls; Westcliff High School for Boys and Westcliff High School for Girls.

Additionally there are two single-sex schools assisted by the Roman Catholic Church: St Bernard's High School (girls) and St Thomas More High School (boys). Both, while not grammar schools, contain a grammar stream; entrance is by the same exam as grammar schools.

Further and higher education
The main higher education provider in Southend is the University of Essex which has a campus in Elmer Approach on the site of  the former Odeon cinema.

In addition to a number of secondary schools that offer further education, the largest provider is South Essex College in a purpose-built building in the centre of town. Formerly known as South East Essex College, (and previously Southend Municipal College) the college changed name in January 2010 following a merger with Thurrock and Basildon College.

Additionally there is PROCAT that is based at Progress Road, while learners can travel to USP College (formerly SEEVIC College) in Thundersley. The East 15 Acting School, a drama school has its second campus in Southend, while the Southend Adult Community College is in Ambleside Drive. Southend United Futsal & Football Education Scholarship, located at Southend United's stadium Roots Hall, provides education for sports scholarships.

Sport

Southend has two football teams, one of professional stature, Southend United. The other, Southend Manor, play in the Essex Senior League. Southend United currently compete in the Vanarama National League.

There are two rugby union clubs Southend RFC which play in London 1 North and Westcliff R.F.C. who play in London & South East Premier. Southend was formerly home to the Essex Eels rugby league team. Southend was home to the Essex Pirates basketball team that played in the British Basketball League between 2009 and 2011.

Essex County Cricket Club play in Southend one week a season. Previously the festival was held at Chalkwell Park and most recently Southchurch Park, but it has now moved to Garons Park next to the Southend Leisure & Tennis Centre. The only other cricket is local.

The Old Southendians Hockey Club is based at Warner's Bridge in Southend.

The eight-lane, floodlit, synthetic athletics track at Southend Leisure and Tennis Centre is home to Southend-on-Sea Athletic Club. The facilities cover all track and field events. The centre has a 25m swimming pool and a world championship level diving pool with 1, 3, 5, 7 and 10m boards, plus springboards with the only 1.3m in the UK.

Entertainment and culture

Southend Pleasure Pier

Kursaal

The Kursaal was one of the earliest theme parks, built at the start of the 20th century. It closed in the 1970s and much of the land was developed as housing. The entrance hall, a listed building, used to house a bowling alley arcade operated by Megabowl and casino, however the bowling alley closed in 2019 and the casino closed in 2020. The building currently stands unused.

Southend Carnival
Southend Carnival has been an annual event since 1906, where it was part of the annual regatta, and was setup to raise funds for the Southend Victoria Cottage Hospital. In 1926 a carnival association was formed, and by 1930 they were raising fund for the building of the new General Hospital with a range of events including a fete in Chalkwell Park. The parades, which included a daylight and torchlight parades were cut down to just a torchlight parade during the 1990s.

Cliff Lift

A short funicular railway, constructed in 1912, links the seafront to the High Street level of the town. The lift re-opened to the public in 2010, following a period of refurbishment.

Other seafront attractions

An amusement park Adventure Island, formerly known as Peter Pan's Playground, straddles the pier entrance. The seafront houses the "Sea-Life Adventure" aquarium.

The cliff gardens, which included Never Never Land and a Victorian bandstand were an attraction until slippage in 2003 made parts of the cliffs unstable. The bandstand has been removed and re-erected in Priory Park.
Beaches include Three Shells and Jubilee Beach.

A modern vertical lift links the base of the High Street with the seafront and the new pier entrance. The older Southend Cliff Railway, a short funicular, is a few hundred metres away.

The London to Southend Classic Car run takes place each summer. It is run by the South Eastern Vintage and Classic Vehicle Club and features classic cars which line the seafront.

The Southend Shakedown, organised by Ace Cafe, is an annual event featuring motorbikes and scooters. There are other scooter runs throughout the year, including the Great London Rideout, which arrives at Southend seafront each year.

Festival events
The Southend-on-Sea Film Festival is an annual event that began in 2009 and is run by the White Bus film and theatrical company based at The Old Waterworks Arts Center located inside a Victorian era Old Water Works plant. Ray Winstone attended the opening night gala in both 2010 and 2011, and has become the Festival Patron.

Since 2008 Chalkwell Park becomes home to the Village Green Art & Music Festival for a weekend every July, but has not run since 2019 due to covid.

Shopping

Southend High Street runs from the top of Pier Hill in the South, to Victoria Circus in the north. It currently has two shopping centres – the Victoria (built during the 1960s and a replacement for the old Talza Arcade, Victoria Arcade and Broadway Market) and The Royals Shopping Centre (built late 1980s and opened in March 1988 by actor Jason Donovan, replacing the bottom part of High Street, Grove Road, Ritz Cinema and Grand Pier Hotel). Southend High Street has many chain stores, with Boots in the Royals, and Next anchoring the Victoria.

This was not always the case with many independent stores closing in the 1970s and 1980s – Keddies (department store), J F Dixons (department store), Brightwells (department store), Garons (grocers, caterers and cinema), Owen Wallis (ironmongers and toys), Bermans (sports and toys), J Patience (photographic retailers) & R. A. Jones (jewellers) being the most notable. One of Southend's most notable business, Schofield and Martin, was purchased by Waitrose in 1944 with the name being used until the 1960s. The Alexandra Street branch was the first Waitrose store in 1951 to be made self-service. Southend is home to the largest store in the Waitrose portfolio.

The longest surviving independent retail business in Southend was Ravens which operated from 1897 to 2017. A Southend family business started in 1937 that was still active in 2014 was Dixons Retail.

The city of Southend has shopping in other areas. Leigh Broadway and Leigh Road in Leigh-on-Sea, Hamlet Court Road in Westcliff-on-Sea, Southchurch Road and London Road are where many of Southend's independent business now reside. Hamlet Court Road was home to one of Southend's longest-standing business, Havens, which opened in 1901. In May 2017 the store announced they would be closing their store to concentrate as an online retailer.

There are regular vintage fairs and markets in Southend, held at a variety of locations including the Leigh Community Centre, the Kursaal and the Railway Hotel. A record fair is frequently held at West Leigh Schools, Ronald Hill Grove, Leigh on Sea.

Parks
Southend is home to many recreation grounds. Its first formal park to open was Prittlewell Square in the 19th century. Since then Priory Park and Victory Sports Grounds were donated by the town benefactor R A Jones, who also has the sports ground Jones Corner Recreation Ground named after his wife. Other formal parks that have opened since are Chalkwell Park and Southchurch Hall along with Southchurch Park, Garon Park and Gunners Park.

Conservation areas
Southend has various Conservation areas across the borough, with the first being designated in 1968.

Art, galleries, museums and libraries

Focal Point Gallery is South Essex's gallery for contemporary visual art, promoting and commissioning major solo exhibitions, group and thematic shows, a programme of events including performances, film screenings and talks, as well as offsite projects and temporary public artworks. The organisation is funded by Southend-on-Sea Borough Council and Arts Council England.

Southend Museums Service, part of Southend on Sea City Council, operates a number of historic attractions, an art gallery and a museum in the city. These include: Beecroft Art Gallery, Southchurch Hall, Prittlewell Priory, Southend Pier Museum and the Central Museum on Victoria Avenue.

The Old Waterworks Arts Center operates in North Road, Westcliff in the former Victorian water works building. It holds art exhibitions, talks and workshops.

Metal, the art organisation set up by Jude Kelly OBE has been based in Chalkwell Hall since 2006. The organisation offers residency space for artists and also organises the Village Green Art & Music Festival.

Southend has several small libraries located in Leigh, Westcliff, Kent Elms and Southchurch. The central library has moved from its traditional location on Victoria Avenue to the Forum in Elmer Approach, a new facility paid for by Southend Council, South Essex College and The University of Essex. It replaced the former Farringdon Multistorey Car Park. The old Central Library building (built 1974) has become home to the Beecroft Gallery.  This building had replaced the former Carnegie funded free library which is now home to the Southend Central Museum.

Theatres
There are a number of theatres. The Edwardian Palace Theatre is a Grade II listed building dating from 1912. It shows plays by professional troupes and repertory groups, as well as comedy acts. The theatre has two circles and the steepest rake in Britain. Part of the theatre is a smaller venue called The Dixon Studio.  The Cliffs Pavilion is a large building to host concerts and performances on ice, as well as pantomimes at Christmas opening in 1964. They are both owned by Southend Council and run by Southend Theatres Ltd.

The most recent closed theatre was the New Empire Theatre. It was, unlike the other two, privately owned. It was used more by amateur groups. The theatre was converted from the old ABC Cinema, which had been the Empire Theatre built in 1896. The New Empire theatre closed in 2009 after a dispute between the trust that run the theatre and its owners. The building was badly damaged by fire on Saturday 1 August 2015 and was demolished in 2017.

The Clifftown Theatre is located in the former Clifftown United Reformed Church and as well as regular performances is part of the East 15 Acting School campus.

Cinema
Southend has one cinema – the Odeon Multiplex at Victoria Circus which has eight screens. The borough of Southend had at one time a total of 18 cinema theatres, with the most famous being the Odeon (formerly the Astoria Theatre), which as well as showing films hosted live entertainers including the Beatles and Laurel and Hardy. This building no longer stands having been replaced by the Southend Campus of the University of Essex. There are plans to build a new 10 screen cinema and entertainment facility on the site of the Seaway Car Park.

Southend has appeared in films over the years, with the New York New York arcade on Marine Parade being used in the British gangsta flick Essex Boys, the premiere of which took place at the Southend Odeon. Southend Airport was used for the filming of the James Bond film Goldfinger. Part of the 1989 black comedy film Killing Dad was set and filmed in Southend.

Southend and the surrounding areas were heavily used and featured in the Viral Marketing for the Universal Pictures 2022 American science fiction action film sequel Jurassic World Dominion, with a number of the featured videos on the DinoTracker website filmed in the Southend area doubling for locations around the world. This is due to the fact that local resident and Jurassic World Franchise marketer Samuel Phillips utilised the area for both videos and imagery.

Music 

Southend has three major venues; Chinnerys, the Riga Club (formerly at the Cricketers Pub London Road) at The Dickens, and the Cliffs Pavilion. The Railway Hotel is a live music pub, which features a variety of acts, and curates the Southend Pier Festival.

Concerts are also shown at the Plaza, a Christian community centre and concert hall based on Southchurch Road, which was formerly a cinema.

Junk Club, at one time a centre of Southend's music scene, was predominantly held in the basement at the Royal Hotel during the period of 2001–06. Co-run by Oliver "Blitz" Abbott & Rhys Webb, of The Horrors, the underground club night played an eclectic mix from Post Punk to Acid House, 1960s Psychedelia to Electro. It was noted as spearheading what became known as the Southend Scene and was featured in the NME, Dazed & Confused, ID, Rolling Stone, Guardian and Vogue. Acts associated with the scene included: The Horrors; These New Puritans; The Violets; Ipso Facto; Neils Children and The Errorplains.

There have also been a number of popular music videos filmed in Southend, by such music artists as Oasis; Morrissey and George Michael.

Bands and musicians originating from Southend include Busted; Get Cape. Wear Cape. Fly; Danielle Dax; Eddie and the Hot Rods; Eight Rounds Rapid; The Horrors; The Kursaal Flyers; Nothing But Thieves; Procol Harum; Scroobius Pip;  These New Puritans and Tonight.

Southend is mentioned in a number of songs including as the end destination in Billy Bragg's "A13, Trunk Road to the sea" where the final line of the chorus is "Southend's the end".

Radio 
In 1981, Southend became the home of Essex Radio, which broadcast from studios below Clifftown Road. The station was formed by several local companies including Keddies, Garons & TOTS nightclub with David Keddie, owner of the Keddies department store in Southend becoming its chairman. In 2004, the renamed Essex FM, then Heart Essex moved to studios in Chelmsford. It is now part of Heart East.

On 28 March 2008, Southend got its own radio station for the first time which is also shared with Chelmsford Radio (formerly known as Dream 107.7 FM and Chelmer FM before that), Southend Radio started broadcasting on 105.1FM from purpose-built studios adjacent to the Adventure Island theme park. The station merged with Chelmsford Radio in 2015 and became Radio Essex.

Television 
Southend has appeared in several television shows and advertisements. It has been used on numerous occasions by the soap EastEnders with its most recent visit in 2022. Southend Pier was used by ITV show Minder for its end credits in season 8, 9 and 10, and since 2014 has been home to Jamie & Jimmy's Friday Night Feast. Advertisements have included Abbey National, CGU Pensions, National Lottery, the 2015 Vauxhall Corsa adverts featuring Electric Avenue, a seafront arcade the 2018 Guide Dogs for the Blind campaign and for the promo for David Hasselhoff's Dave programme Hoff the Record.

In fiction

Southend is the seaside vacation place chosen by the John Knightley family in Emma by Jane Austen, published 1816. The family arrived by stage coach, and strongly preferred it to the choice of the Perry family, Cromer, which was 100 miles from London, compared to the easier distance of 40 miles from the London home of the John and Isabella Knightley, as discussed at length with Mr Woodhouse in the novel in Chapter XII of volume one.

In The Hitchhiker's Guide to the Galaxy by Douglas Adams, after being saved from death in the vacuum of space, Arthur Dent and Ford Prefect find themselves in a distorted version of Southend (a consequence of the starship Heart of Gold'''s Infinite Improbability Drive). Dent briefly feared that both he and Prefect did in fact die, based on a childhood nightmare where his friends went to either Heaven or Hell but he went to Southend.Dance on My Grave, a book by Aidan Chambers, is set in Southend. Chambers had worked as a teacher in the city's Westcliff High School for Boys for three years.

 Places of worship 

There are churches in the borough catering to different Christian denominations, such as Our Lady Help of Christians and St Helen's Church for the Roman Catholic community. There are two synagogues; one for orthodox Jews, in Westcliff, and a reform synagogue in Chalkwell. Three mosques provide for the Muslim population; one run by the Bangladeshi community, and the others run by the Pakistani community.
There are two Hindu Temples, BAPS Shri Swaminarayan Mandir and Southend Meenatshe Suntharasar Temple, while there is one Buddhist temple, Amita Buddha Centre.

 York Road Market 

Demolition of the historic covered market began on 23 April 2010. The site became a car park. A temporary market was held there every Friday until 2012 after the closure of the former Southend market at the rear of the Odeon. As of 2013, a market is now held in the High Street every Thursday with over 30 stalls.

 Twin towns 
Southend-on-Sea is twinned with:
  Sopot, Poland, since October 1999

 Notable people 

 David Amess (1952–2021), British politician and local MP who was stabbed to death in 2021; Southend was named a city in his honour.
 Martyn Andrews, TV presenter and broadcaster
 Jasmine Armfield, actress
 Trevor Bailey, cricketer
 John Barber (1919–2004), former Finance Director of Ford of Europe & Managing Director of British Leyland.
 Mathew Baynton, musician, writer, actor
 David Bellos, professor/translator
Angie Best, ex-wife of George Best
 Brinn Bevan, artistic gymnast
 James Booth, actor
 James Bourne, musician, singer Busted
 Tim Bowler, children's author
 Kevin Bowyer, concert organist
 Gary Brooker, lead singer of Procol Harum
 Dave Brown, comedian and actor
 Dean Chalkley, photographer
 Aidan Chambers, Author
 Jeannie Clark, former professional wrestling manager
 Brian Cleeve, author and broadcaster
 Dick Clement, screenwriter
 Dorothy Coke, artist
 Eric Kirkham Cole, businessman
 Peter Cook, architect
 Phil Cornwell, actor and impressionist
 Tina Cousins, singer
 Gemma Craven, actress
 Rosalie Cunningham, singer-songwriter-multi-instrumentalist
 Matthew Cutler, ballroom dancer
 Trevor Dawkins, footballer
 Danielle Dax, musician, actress and performance artist
 Warwick Deeping, author
 Richard de Southchurch, knight and landowner.
 Andy Ducat, cricketer, footballer.
 Sam Duckworth, musician
 Warren Ellis, novelist and comic writer
 Nathalie Emmanuel, actress
 Digby Fairweather, jazz musician, author.
 Mark Foster, swimmer
 John Fowles, author
 Becky Frater, first female helicopter commander in the Royal Navy and female member of the Black Cats display team
 John Georgiadis, violinist and conductor
 Edward Greenfield (3 July 1928 – 1 July 2015) chief music writer in The Guardian from 1977 to 1993 and biographer of Andre Previn
 Benjamin Grosvenor, pianist
 Daniel Hardcastle, author
 Roy Hay, musician
 Joshua Hayward, guitarist for The Horrors
 John Hodge, aerospace engineer
 John Horsley, actor
 John Hutton, politician
 Wilko Johnson, singer, guitarist and songwriter; Game of Thrones actor
 Daniel Jones, musician, producer
 R. A. Jones, store owner and town benefactor
 Phill Jupitus, comedian
 Mickey Jupp, musician
 Russell Kane, comedian
 Dominic Littlewood, TV presenter
 John Lloyd, tennis player
 Robert Lloyd, opera singer
 Ron Martin, Southend United chairman, 1998–present
 Frank Matcham, English theatre designer, retired and died in Southend
 Lee Mead, musical theatre actor
 Jon Miller, TV presenter
 Helen Mirren, actress
 Jack Monroe, blogger, campaigner
 Peggy Mount, actress
 Tris Vonna Michell, artist
 Dicky Moore, singer-songwriter, guitarist
 Maajid Nawaz, former Islamist activist who now campaigns against extremism
 Julian Okai, English footballer
 Michael Osborne, first-class cricketer
 Annabel Port, broadcaster
 Stephen Port, serial killer
 Spencer Prior, footballer
 Lara Pulver, actress
 Rachel Riley, Countdown'' co-presenter
 Simon Schama, historian / TV presenter
 Jack Sims, football goalkeeper
 Anne Stallybrass, actress
 Vivian Stanshall, musician
 Sam Strike, actor
 Keith Taylor, politician
 Peter Taylor, football manager
 Theoretical Girl, singer-songwriter
 Steve Tilson, footballer – voted Southend United's greatest ever player
 Kara Tointon, actress
 Hannah Tointon, actress
 Robin Trower, rock-blues guitarist
 Gary Vandermolen, footballer
 David Webb, football manager
 Paul Webb, musician, bassist for Talk Talk
 Rhys "Spider" Webb, bassist of The Horrors
 Michael Wilding, actor
 David Witts, actor 
 Ian Yearsley, local historian and author 
 Nothing But Thieves, musicians

References

External links 
 
 
 
 
 
 Southend Punk Rock History 1976 – 1986, a detailed site containing information on the Punk Rock explosion as experienced by Southend-on-Sea, Essex, UK

 
 
Towns in Essex
Beaches of Essex
Local government districts of the East of England
Local government in Essex
Populated coastal places in Essex
Port cities and towns of the North Sea
Seaside resorts in Essex
Unitary authority districts of England
Former civil parishes in Essex
Cities in the East of England
Boroughs in England